FC Zvezda Serpukhov is a Russian football club from Serpukhov.

History
It was founded in 2006 by merger of Serpukhov clubs FC Lokomotiv-M (2002–2005) and FC Serpukhov (1999–2005). Zvezda played in Russian Second Division (Center zone) in 2006–2009. Since 2010 it plays in amateur Russian championship (Moscow oblast zone, group A).

Another Serpukhov club existed in the past was also named Zvezda in some part of its history (its names: Serpukhov town team – 1961–1962, Zvezda – 1963–1967, Avangard – 1968–1969); it played in Soviet lower leagues. Current club declares itself legatee of historical club heritage.

Sources

External links
Official Website

Association football clubs established in 2006
Football clubs in Russia
Football in Moscow Oblast
2006 establishments in Russia